Solanum wendlandii, the giant potato creeper, potato vine, Costa Rican nightshade, divorce vine, or paradise flower, is a species of flowering plant in the family Solanaceae. It is native to Mexico, Central America, and northwest South America, and has been widely introduced as an ornamental to other tropical locales, including the Caribbean, Africa, Nepal, Java, and many islands in the Indian and Pacific Oceans. A robust vine reaching , its long-lasting dark purple flowers eventually fade to white.

References

wendlandii
Ornamental plants
Flora of Northeastern Mexico
Flora of Southwestern Mexico
Flora of Southeastern Mexico
Flora of Central Mexico
Flora of Veracruz
Flora of Honduras
Flora of Nicaragua
Flora of Costa Rica
Flora of Panama
Flora of Venezuela
Flora of the Venezuelan Antilles
Flora of Colombia
Flora of Peru
Plants described in 1887